Ivan Cacchioli (born 17 July 1990) is an Italian footballer who plays as a goalkeeper.

Career 
Circa 2011 Ivan Cacchioli was signed by Parma in a 5-year contract. he joined third-tier side Pavia on loan immediately in a year-long deal.

In 2014, he was signed by L'Aquila Calcio 1927.

In 2015, he was signed by Lega Pro club Pontedera as a free agent. He was released again in mid-season.

References 

Living people
1990 births
Italian footballers
Association football goalkeepers
Parma Calcio 1913 players
F.C. Pavia players
ND Gorica players
Slovenian PrvaLiga players
Italian expatriate footballers
Italian expatriate sportspeople in Slovenia
Expatriate footballers in Slovenia